The Truck Act 1940 (3 & 4 Geo 6 c 38) was an Act of the Parliament of the United Kingdom. It was one of the Truck Acts 1831 to 1940. It was passed in response to the decision in Pratt v Cook, Son & Co (St. Paul's) in which the court interpreted the Truck Acts in a novel way.

The whole Act was repealed by sections 11 and 32(2) of, and Schedule 1 to, Part III of Schedule 5 to, the Wages Act 1986.

Section 1
Sections 1(1) and (3) were repealed by Schedule 1 to the Statute Law (Repeals) Act 1973.

Section 3
Section 3(2) was repealed in part by Schedule 1 to the Statute Law (Repeals) Act 1973.

See also
History of labour law in the United Kingdom

References
Halsbury's Statutes,
B A Hepple, Paul O'Higgins and Lord Wedderburn of Charlton. Sweet & Maxwell's Labour Relations Statutes and Materials. Second Edition. Sweet & Maxwell. London. 1983. . pp 32 & 33.

United Kingdom Acts of Parliament 1940